Norapidia is a genus of moths in the family Lasiocampidae. The genus was erected by Max Wilhelm Karl Draudt in 1927.

Species
Norapidia divisata Dognin, 1917
Norapidia subdelineata Dognin, 1917

References

Lasiocampidae